The 2019 Men's Indoor Asia Cup was the eighth edition of the Men's Indoor Hockey Asia Cup, the biennial international men's indoor hockey championship of Asia organized by the Asian Hockey Federation. It was held alongside the women's tournament in Chonburi, Thailand from 15 to 21 July 2019.

Iran were the defending champions having won the 2017 edition. Iran defended their title by defeating Kazakhstan 10–0 in the final. Malaysia won the bronze medal by defeating Uzbekistan 6–3.

Teams
For the first time ever there were 10 teams competing in the tournament which is the highest amount of competing teams ever. Bangladesh, Nepal and the Philippines made their debuts.

Results
The match schedule and pools compositions were released on 21 May 2019 by the Asian Hockey Federation.

All times are local, ICT (UTC+7).

Preliminary round

Pool A

Pool B

Fifth to tenth place classification

Ninth and tenth place

Seventh and eighth place

Fifth and sixth place

First to fourth place classification

Semi-finals

Third and fourth place

Final

Final standings

See also
2019 Women's Indoor Hockey Asia Cup

References

Indoor Hockey Asia Cup
Asia Cup
International field hockey competitions hosted by Thailand
Indoor Hockey Asia Cup Men
Indoor Hockey Asia Cup Men
Sport in Chonburi province